"The Sell Out" is the ninth episode of the second series of the 1960s cult British spy-fi television series The Avengers, starring Patrick Macnee. It was first broadcast by ABC on 24 November 1962. The episode was directed by Don Leaver and written by Brandon Brady and Anthony Terpiloff.

Plot
Steed, though under suspicion himself, leads an operation to flush out a traitor plotting to assassinate a foreign dignitary. Dr. King initially refuses to be involved, but comes to Steed's aid.

Cast
 Patrick Macnee as John Steed
 Jon Rollason as Dr. Martin King 
 Frank Gatliff as Mark Harvey  
 Carleton Hobbs as Monsieur Roland 
 Arthur Hewlett as One Twelve  
 Gillian Muir as Judy 
 Anne Godley as Lillian Harvey 
 Michael Mellinger as Fraser   
 Richard Klee as Workman 
 Storm Durr as Gunman   
 Cyril Renison as Customer   
 Anthony Blackshaw as Policeman 
 Ray Browne as Price

References

External links

Episode overview on The Avengers Forever! website

The Avengers (season 2) episodes
1962 British television episodes